Dominic Black (born in Lexington, Kentucky) was a notable wrestler for West Virginia University.

He is one of only six wrestlers in WVU history to have more than 100 career wins, with a 105-36-2 record. As a junior, he went 33-5, won an EWL title, and competed in his second straight NCAA tournament. In his senior season, he recorded a 39-win record, another EWL title, All-American honors and another trip to the NCAA tournament.

In 1992, Black took first place with University Freestyle National Champion honors. In 1995, he was the first West Virginia wrestler to represent the United States in an international event. He won two gold medals at the World Cup of Freestyle.

In 1997, Black entered the United States Army and is a member of the Army’s World Class Athlete Program that allows him to wrestle and recruit for the Army. Black is a member of the US national freestyle team and is competing to wrestle in the Olympic Games.

Black began wrestling as a sophomore at Henry Clay High School in Lexington Kentucky and barely posted a winning record and was unable to qualify for the regional tournament.  However, his record improved his junior year followed up by a senior season which included a state championship and the 1987 state tournament's outstanding wrestler.

References

Living people
Sportspeople from Lexington, Kentucky
West Virginia Mountaineers wrestlers
American male sport wrestlers
Pan American Games medalists in wrestling
Pan American Games gold medalists for the United States
Wrestlers at the 1999 Pan American Games
Year of birth missing (living people)
Medalists at the 1999 Pan American Games
20th-century American people